Ezell G. Lee (April 9, 1933 – May 21, 2012) was a Republican (formerly Democratic) member of the Mississippi Senate, who represented the 47th district from 1992 to 2012..

A member of the Mississippi House of Representatives from 1987 through 1991, he was originally elected as a Democrat. Lee switched parties on February 17, 2011 to become a Republican. He died of cancer in 2012.

References

External links
Project Vote Smart - Senator Ezell Lee (MS) profile
Follow the Money - Ezell Lee
2007 2005 2003 1999 campaign contributions

1938 births
2012 deaths
Schoolteachers from Mississippi
Members of the Mississippi House of Representatives
Mississippi Democrats
Mississippi Republicans
Mississippi state senators
People from Hancock County, Mississippi
People from Picayune, Mississippi
University of Southern Mississippi alumni
William Carey University alumni
Deaths from cancer in Mississippi